Jeanette Winterson  (born 27 August 1959) is an English author. Her first book, Oranges Are Not the Only Fruit, was a semi-autobiographical novel about a sensitive teenage girl rebelling against convention. Other novels explore gender polarities and sexual identity and later ones the relations between humans and technology. She broadcasts and teaches creative writing. She has won a Whitbread Prize for a First Novel, a BAFTA Award for Best Drama, the John Llewellyn Rhys Prize, the E. M. Forster Award and the St. Louis Literary Award, and the Lambda Literary Award twice. She has received an Officer of the Order of the British Empire (OBE) and a Commander of the Order of the British Empire (CBE) for services to literature, and is a Fellow of the Royal Society of Literature.

Early life
Winterson was born in Manchester and adopted by Constance and John William Winterson on 21 January 1960. She grew up in Accrington, Lancashire, and was raised in the Elim Pentecostal Church. She was raised to become a Pentecostal Christian missionary, and she began evangelising and writing sermons at the age of six.

By the age of 16, Winterson had come out as a lesbian and left home. She soon after attended Accrington and Rossendale College, and supported herself at a variety of odd jobs while studying English at the University of Oxford.

Career
After she moved to London, she wrote her first novel, Oranges Are Not the Only Fruit, which won the 1985 Whitbread Prize for a First Novel. Winterson adapted it for television in 1990. Her novel The Passion was set in Napoleonic Europe.

Winterson's subsequent novels explore the boundaries of physicality and the imagination, gender polarities, and sexual identities, and have won several literary awards. Her stage adaptation of The PowerBook in 2002 opened at the Royal National Theatre, London. She also bought a derelict terraced house in Spitalfields, east London, which she refurbished into an occasional flat and a ground-floor shop, Verde's, to sell organic food. In January 2017 she discussed closing the shop when a spike in rateable value, and so business rates, threatened to make the business untenable.

In 2009, Winterson donated the short story "Dog Days" to Oxfam's Ox-Tales project, covering four collections of UK stories by 38 authors. Her story appeared in the Fire collection. She also supported the relaunch of the Bush Theatre in London's Shepherd's Bush. She wrote and performed work for the Sixty Six Books project, based on a chapter of the King James Bible, along with other novelists and poets including Paul Muldoon, Carol Ann Duffy, Anne Michaels and Catherine Tate.

Winterson's 2012 novella The Daylight Gate, based on the 1612 Pendle Witch Trials, appeared on their 400th anniversary. Its main character, Alice Nutter, is based on the real-life woman of the same name. The Guardian'''s Sarah Hall describes the work: "the narrative voice is irrefutable; this is old-fashioned storytelling, with a sermonic tone that commands and terrifies. It's also like courtroom reportage, sworn witness testimony. The sentences are short, truthful – and dreadful.... Absolutism is Winterson's forte, and it's the perfect mode to verify supernatural events when they occur. You're not asked to believe in magic. Magic exists. A severed head talks. A man is transmogrified into a hare. The story is stretched as tight as a rack, so the reader's disbelief is ruptured rather than suspended. And if doubt remains, the text's sensuality persuades."

In 2012, Winterson succeeded Colm Tóibín as Professor of Creative Writing at the University of Manchester.

Awards and recognition
1985: Whitbread Prize for a First Novel for Oranges Are Not the Only Fruit1987: John Llewellyn Rhys Prize for The Passion1989: E. M. Forster Award for Sexing the Cherry1992: BAFTA Award for Best Drama for Oranges Are Not the Only Fruit TV serial
1994: Winner, Lesbian Fiction category, Lambda Literary Awards for Written on the Body2006: Officer of the Order of the British Empire (OBE) in the 2006 New Year Honours, for services to literature
2013: Winner, Lesbian Memoir or Biography category, Lambda Literary Awardsm for Why Be Happy When You Could Be Normal?2014: St. Louis Literary Award
2016: Chosen as one of BBC's 100 Women.
2016: Elected Fellow of the Royal Society of Literature
2018: She presented the 42nd Richard Dimbleby Lecture in celebration of 100 years of women's suffrage in the UK
2018: Commander of the Order of the British Empire (CBE) in the 2018 Birthday Honours, for services to literature
2019: Longlisted for the Booker Prize for Frankissstein: A Love StoryPersonal life
Winterson came out as a lesbian at the age of 16. Her 1987 novel The Passion was inspired by her relationship with Pat Kavanagh, her literary agent. From 1990 to 2002, Winterson had a relationship with BBC radio broadcaster and academic Peggy Reynolds. After that ended, Winterson became involved with theatre director Deborah Warner. In 2015, she married psychotherapist Susie Orbach, author of Fat is a Feminist Issue. The couple separated in 2019.

BibliographyOranges Are Not the Only Fruit (1985)Boating for Beginners (1985)Fit for the Future: The Guide for Women Who Want to Live Well (1986)The Passion (1987)Sexing the Cherry (1989)Oranges Are Not The Only Fruit: the script (1990)Written on the Body (1992)Art & Lies: A Piece for Three Voices and a Bawd (1994)Great Moments in Aviation: the script (1995)Art Objects: Essays in Ecstasy and Effrontery (1995) - essaysGut Symmetries (1997)The World and Other Places (1998) - short storiesThe Dreaming House (1998)The Powerbook (2000)The King of Capri (2003) - children's literatureLighthousekeeping (2004)Weight (2005)Tanglewreck (2006) - children's literatureThe Stone Gods (2007)The Battle of the Sun (2009) Ingenious (2009)The Lion, The Unicorn and Me: The Donkey's Christmas Story (2009)Why Be Happy When You Could Be Normal? (2011) - memoirThe Daylight Gate (2012)The Gap of Time (2015)Christmas Days: 12 Stories and 12 Feasts for 12 Days (2016)Eight Ghosts: The English Heritage Book of New Ghost Stories  (2017)Courage Calls to Courage Everywhere (2018)Frankissstein: A Love Story (2019)12 Bytes: How We Got Here. Where We Might Go Next (2021)

References

External links

Jeanette Winterson author page by Guardian Unlimited

Guardian podcast interview (2007)
Rain Taxi interview (2005)
Guardian interview (2000)
An extended autobiographical article in The Guardian'', Friday 28 October 2011: Retrieved 1 November 2011.
2012 radio interview (30 minutes) at The Bat Segundo Show

1959 births
20th-century British short story writers
20th-century English novelists
20th-century English women writers
21st-century British novelists
21st-century English women writers
21st-century British short story writers
Alumni of St Catherine's College, Oxford
BBC 100 Women
British women short story writers
Commanders of the Order of the British Empire
Costa Book Award winners
English adoptees
English memoirists
English screenwriters
English short story writers
English women non-fiction writers
English women novelists
John Llewellyn Rhys Prize winners
Lambda Literary Award for Lesbian Fiction winners
English lesbian writers
English LGBT novelists
Lesbian memoirists
Living people
Magic realism writers
People from Accrington
British women memoirists
Writers from Manchester
Fellows of the Royal Society of Literature